Bulbophyllum laxiflorum is a species of orchid in the genus Bulbophyllum.

References
The Bulbophyllum-Checklist
The Internet Orchid Species Photo Encyclopedia

External links 
 
 

laxiflorum
Taxa named by Carl Ludwig Blume